Hiromi "Romi" Dames (born November 5, 1979) is an American actress.

Biography 
Born to a Japanese mother and Jewish American father, Hiromi (later shortened to Romi), lived in Japan until she turned 13; soon after, her father retired and moved the family to Seattle, Washington. After finishing high school in Seattle, Romi was accepted to the University of Washington. She is best known for her role as Traci Van Horn, the nasal-voiced celebrity on Hannah Montana and the voice of Musa in Nickelodeon's Winx Club. Other credits include recurring roles on The Young and the Restless, Bill Nye the Science Guy and Sci-Squad.

Romi currently serves as a Star Power Ambassador for Starlight Children's Foundation, encouraging other young people to commit their time, energy and resources to help other kids and working with Starlight to brighten the lives of seriously ill children. She is Jewish.

Filmography

References

External links 
 

1979 births
Living people
Actresses from Seattle
American actresses of Japanese descent
Japanese emigrants to the United States
American people of Jewish descent
American television actresses
University of Washington alumni
American voice actresses
21st-century American women